The second series of Promi Big Brother started on 15 August 2014 and ended on 29 August 2014. It is the second series of the Big Brother franchise on Sat.1, after it left RTL II. Twelve celebrity housemates ("promis") entered the house on Day 1. The show is hosted by Jochen Schropp.

Format 
Promis had participated in tasks and matches for treats or to avoid punishments. Daily nominations also took place (from Day 8 to 14). Furthermore, the house consists of two floors, the upper luxury floor and the lower poverty floor. Housemates on the luxury floor choose of the poor housemates to join them upstairs, whilst the public will vote one of the 7 downstairs.

House
This year's Promi Big Brother contains two floors, each floor having its separate living areas, bathrooms, bedrooms and diary rooms. The upper floor is luxurious, whilst the lower floor is meager with no beds or real seatings.

Promis 
Originally seven celebrity housemates entered upstairs on Day 3, whilst other five entered downstairs two days earlier (Day 1).

Nominations table 

  Housemates living downstairs after week 1.
  Housemates living upstairs after week 1.

Notes 

  All housemates downstairs won immunity because one housemate from there was already evicted, to equilibrate the numbers.
  By default, everyone faced the public vote.
  Housemates nominated face-to-face. Housemates was only allowed to nominate within each team. The housemates of either team with the most votes face the public vote.
  The housemate with the most nominations had to choose with whom he or she would face the public vote.
  Housemates are allowed to nominate themselves. Every housemate with at least one nomination faces the public vote.

Nominations: Results

Ratings

References

External links 
 Official homepage

2014 German television seasons
02